X-K FM (or  FM) is a South African community radio station based in the Northern Cape. It was founded on 18 August 2000. Its mission is to preserve the !Xun and Khwe languages and cultures, uplifting, developing and informing the community.

Coverage Areas & Frequencies 
30 km radius around Platfontein (Sol Plaatje Local Municipality), which is approximately 15 km from Kimberley on the road to Barkly West in the Northern Cape.

Broadcast Languages
!Xun
Khwe
Afrikaans (as a bridging language)

Broadcast Time
06:00 - 18:00 
06:00 - 21:00

Target Audience
San people of Platfontein in the Northern Cape
LSM Groups 1 – 6
Age Groups:
16 - 24 (21%)
25 - 34 (34%)
35 - 49 (15%)
50+ (30%)

Listenership Figures

References

External links
SAARF Website
Sentech Website

Community radio stations in South Africa
Radio stations established in 2000
Mass media in the Northern Cape
Sol Plaatje Local Municipality